The Museum of Hanoi is located in Nam Từ Liêm district of Hanoi, Vietnam. The museum displays artifacts from Hanoi's 1000-year history and the history, culture, heritage, and architecture of Vietnam. It showcases over 50,000 artifacts in a total area of nearly 54,000 square meters.

The Hanoi museum was opened in 2010 for the Millennial Anniversary of Hanoi.

The exhibition building has an inverted pyramid shape.

External links 

Museums in Hanoi
History museums in Vietnam
Millennial Anniversary of Hanoi
Museum
Inverted pyramids
Pyramids in Asia
Buildings and structures completed in 2010
Museums established in 2010
2010 establishments in  Vietnam